Princess Bimbhaktra Bhani Svastivatana (complete title: Her Serene Highness Princess (Mom Chao) Bimbhaktra Bhani Svastivatana, ; 22 December 1855 – 22 August 1934) was a Princess of Siam, a member of Siamese royal family and a member House of Svastivatana, a royal house which was originated by her father and descends from Chakri Dynasty and half-sister of Queen Rambhai Barni.

Princess Bimbhaktra Bhani Svastivatana was daughter of Prince Svasti Sobhana, the Prince of Svastivatana Visishtha and Mom Lamul ( Pisolyabut ) Svastivatana na Ayudhaya. She had 2 sisters and 1 younger brother.
  Princess Dhasani Nonglaksana Svastivatana
  Princess Bimbhaktra Bhani Svastivatana
  Prince Chalermsrisvastivatana Svastivatana
  Princess Nonglaksana Dhasani Svastivatana

References 

19th-century births
1934 deaths
Bimbhaktra Bhani Svastivatana
Bimbhaktra Bhani Svastivatana
Bimbhaktra Bhani Svastivatana
19th-century Chakri dynasty
20th-century Chakri dynasty